Margaret Haile was a Canadian socialist in the late nineteenth and early twentieth centuries, a teacher and journalist by profession. She was active in the socialist movements in both Canada and the United States. Frederic Heath's "Socialism in America", published in January 1900 in the Social Democracy Red Book, lists her, along with Corinne Stubbs Brown and Eugene V. Debs, among "One Hundred Well-known Social Democrats".

Biography 
Born in Canada, Haile spent some time working for socialist causes in New England. A resident of Massachusetts in 1901, Haile was a member of the nine member unity committee of the Chicago faction of the Social Democratic Party as it planned the formation of the Socialist Party of America. She was one of two women on that body.

Haile returned to Canada shortly thereafter, and became in 1902 the first woman to run for legislative office in Canada, when she was nominated on the platform of the Canadian Socialist League as a candidate in Toronto North in the 1902 Ontario provincial election. Although her nomination was accepted and she received 79 votes, a woman was not eligible to sit as a member of the Legislative Assembly. She may have been the first woman to run for major elected office within the entire British Empire.

In popular culture 
Several episodes of Murdoch Mysteries (season 8 - 2015, episode 10 "Murdoch and the Temple of Death", episode 16 "Crabtree Mania" and episode 17 "Election Day") depict Margaret Haile, during and after her campaign in the 1902 Ontario provincial election.  She is played by actress Nicole Underhay.

References

External links 
 Margaret Haile, "Some Theories of Party Organization", Social Democratic Herald, Vol. 4, No. 1 (22 June 1901) (accessed 28 November 2006)

American socialists
Canadian expatriates in the United States
Canadian socialists
Socialist Party of America politicians from Massachusetts
Women in Ontario politics
Year of birth missing
Year of death missing